Mount Vesuvius (also  or ;  , also ,  or ) is a somma-stratovolcano located on the Gulf of Naples in Campania, Italy, about  east of Naples and a short distance from the shore. It is one of several volcanoes forming the Campanian volcanic arc. Vesuvius consists of a large cone partially encircled by the steep rim of a summit caldera, resulting from the collapse of an earlier, much higher structure.

The eruption of Mount Vesuvius in AD 79 destroyed the Roman cities of Pompeii, Herculaneum, Oplontis, Stabiae, and several other settlements. More than 1,000 people are thought to have died in the eruption, though the exact toll is unknown. The only surviving eyewitness account of the event consists of two letters by Pliny the Younger to the historian Tacitus.

Vesuvius has erupted many times since. It is the only volcano on Europe's mainland to have erupted in the last hundred years. It is regarded as one of the most dangerous volcanoes in the world because 3,000,000 people live near enough to be affected by an eruption, with at least 600,000 in the danger zone. This is the most densely populated volcanic region in the world. Eruptions tend to be violent and explosive; these are known as Plinian eruptions.

Mythology
Vesuvius has a long historic and literary tradition. It was considered a divinity of the Genius type at the time of the eruption of AD 79: it appears under the inscribed name Vesuvius as a serpent in the decorative frescos of many , or household shrines, surviving from Pompeii. An inscription from Capua to  indicates that he was worshipped as a power of Jupiter; that is, Jupiter Vesuvius.

The Romans regarded Mount Vesuvius to be devoted to Hercules. The historian Diodorus Siculus relates a tradition that Hercules, in the performance of his labors, passed through the country of nearby Cumae on his way to Sicily and found there a place called "the Phlegraean Plain" (Φλεγραῖον πεδίον, "plain of fire"), "from a hill which anciently vomited out fire ... now called Vesuvius." It was inhabited by giant bandits, "the sons of the Earth. With the gods' assistance, he pacified the region and continued. The facts behind the tradition, if any, remain unknown, as does whether  was named after it. An epigram by the poet Martial in 88 AD suggests that both Venus, patroness of Pompeii, and Hercules were worshipped in the region devastated by the eruption of 79.

Etymology
 was a name of the volcano in frequent use by the authors of the late Roman Republic and the early Roman Empire. Many scholars since then have offered an etymology. As peoples of varying ethnicity and language occupied Campania in the Roman Iron Age, the etymology depends to a large degree on the presumption of what language was spoken there at the time. Naples was settled by Greeks, as the name , "New City", testifies. The Oscans, an Italic people, lived in the countryside. The Latins also competed for the occupation of Campania. Etruscan settlements were in the vicinity. Other peoples of unknown provenance are said to have been there at some time by various ancient authors.

Some theories about its origin are:
 From Greek  = "not" prefixed to a root from or related to the Greek word  = "I quench", in the sense of "unquenchable".
 From Greek  = "I hurl" and  "violence", "hurling violence", *vesbia, taking advantage of the collateral form.
 From an Indo-European root, *eus- < *ewes- < *h₁ews-, "shine", "burn", sense "the one who lightens", through Latin or 
 From an Indo-European root *wes = "hearth" (compare e.g. Vesta)

Topography

Vesuvius is a "humpbacked" peak, consisting of a large cone (Gran Cono) partially encircled by the steep rim of a summit caldera caused by the collapse of an earlier (and originally much higher) structure called Mount Somma. The Gran Cono was produced during the A.D. 79 eruption. For this reason, the volcano is also called Somma-Vesuvius or Somma-Vesuvio.

The caldera started forming during an eruption around 17,000–18,000 years ago and was enlarged by later paroxysmal eruptions, ending in the one of AD 79. This structure has given its name to the term "somma volcano", which describes any volcano with a summit caldera surrounding a newer cone.

The volcano's slopes are scarred by lava flows, while the rest are heavily vegetated, with scrub and forests at higher altitudes and vineyards lower down.

Formation

Vesuvius is a stratovolcano and was formed as a result of the collision of two tectonic plates, the African and the Eurasian. The former was subducted at a convergent boundary beneath the latter, deeper into the earth. As the water-saturated sediments of the African oceanic plate were pushed to hotter depths inside the planet, the water boiled off and lowered the melting point of the upper mantle enough to partially melt the rocks. Because magma is less dense than the solid rock around it, it was pushed upward. Finding a weak spot at the Earth's surface, it broke through, thus forming the volcano. 

The volcano is one of several forming the Campanian volcanic arc. Others include Campi Flegrei, a large caldera a few kilometers to the north-west, Mount Epomeo,  to the west on the island of Ischia, and several undersea volcanoes to the south. The arc forms the southern end of a larger chain of volcanoes produced by the subduction process described above, which extends northwest along the length of Italy as far as Monte Amiata in Southern Tuscany. Vesuvius is the only one to have erupted in recent history, although some of the others have erupted within the last few hundred years. Many are either extinct or have not erupted for tens of thousands of years.

Eruptions

Mount Vesuvius has erupted many times. Numerous others preceded the eruption in AD 79 in prehistory, including at least three significantly larger; an example is the Avellino eruption around 1800 BC, which engulfed several Bronze Age settlements. Since AD 79, the volcano has also erupted repeatedly, in 172, 203, 222, possibly in 303, 379, 472, 512, 536, 685, 787, around 860, around 900, 968, 991, 999, 1006, 1037, 1049, around 1073, 1139, 1150, and there may have been eruptions in 1270, 1347, and 1500.
The volcano erupted again in 1631, six times in the 18th century (including 1779 and 1794), eight times in the 19th century (notably in 1872), and in 1906, 1929 and 1944. There have been no eruptions since 1944, and none of the eruptions after AD 79 were as large or destructive as the Pompeian one.

The eruptions vary greatly in severity but are characterized by explosive outbursts of the kind dubbed Plinian after Pliny the Younger, a Roman writer who published a detailed description of the AD 79 eruption, including his uncle's death. A few times since 1944, landslides in the crater have raised clouds of ash dust, raising false alarms of an eruption.

Since 1750, seven of the eruptions of Vesuvius have had durations of more than five years; only Mount Etna has had as many long-duration eruptions in the last 270 years. The two most recent eruptions of Vesuvius (1875–1906 and 1913–1944) each lasted more than 30 years.

Vesuvius is still regarded as an active volcano, although its current activity produces little more than sulfur-rich steam from vents at the bottom and walls of the crater. 

Layers of lava, ash, scoria and pumice make up the volcanic peak. Their mineralogy is variable, but generally silica-undersaturated and rich in potassium, with phonolite produced in the more explosive eruptions (e.g. the eruption in 1631 displaying a complete stratigraphic and petrographic description: phonolite was firstly erupted, followed by a tephritic phonolite and finally a phonolitic tephrite).

Volcanic explosivity index
According to the Smithsonian Institution's Global Volcanism Program, Vesuvius has had 54 confirmed eruptions during the Holocene Epoch (the last 11,700 years). A volcanic explosivity index (VEI) has been assigned to all but one of these eruptions.

Before AD 79

Scientific knowledge of the geologic history of Vesuvius comes from core samples taken from a  plus borehole on the flanks of the volcano, extending into Mesozoic rock. Cores were dated by potassium–argon and argon–argon dating. The area has been subject to volcanic activity for at least 400,000 years; the lowest layer of eruption material from the Somma caldera lies on top of the 40,000-year‑old Campanian ignimbrite produced by the Campi Flegrei complex. The volcanic complex stands on a large, sedimentary plain.
25,000 years ago: Vesuvius started forming in the Codola Plinian eruption.
Vesuvius was then built up by a series of lava flows, with some smaller explosive eruptions interspersed between them. By this time, the volcano was 2,000 meters (6,560 feet) tall, with the summit being 500 meters (1,640 feet) east of the current summit.
About 19,000 years ago: the style of eruption changed to a sequence of large explosive and caldera-forming Plinian eruptions, of which the AD 79 one was the most recent. The calderas are aligned in a roughly east-west direction, and all contributed to forming present-day's Somma caldera. The eruptions are named after the tephra deposits produced by them, which in turn are named after the place where the deposits were first identified:
 18,300 years ago: the Basal Pumice (Pomici di Base) eruption, VEI 6, the original formation of the Somma caldera. The caldera's formation was asymmetric towards the west. The eruption was followed by a period of much less violent, lava-producing eruptions.
 16,000 years ago: the Green Pumice (Pomici Verdoline) eruption, VEI 5.
 Around 11,000 years ago: the Lagno Amendolare eruption, smaller than the Mercato eruption.
 8,000 years ago: the Mercato eruption (Pomici di Mercato) – also known as Pomici Gemelle or Pomici Ottaviano, VEI 6.
 Around 5,000 years ago: two explosive eruptions smaller than the Avellino eruption.
Several carbon dates on wood and bones offer a range of possible dates of about 500 years in the mid-2nd millennium BC. In May 2001, near Nola, Italian archaeologists using the technique of filling every cavity with plaster or substitute compound, recovered some remarkably well-preserved forms of perishable objects, such as fence rails, a bucket and especially in the vicinity, thousands of human footprints pointing into the Apennines to the north. The settlement had huts, pots and goats. The residents had hastily abandoned the village, leaving it to be buried under pumice and ash in much the same way that Pompeii and Herculaneum were later preserved.
 The volcano then entered a stage of more frequent, but less violent eruptions, until the most recent Plinian eruption, which destroyed Pompeii and Herculaneum. Evidence of these eruptions comes from badly preserved ashfall deposits that have been dubitatively assigned to Either the Somma-Vesuvius complex, or the Phlegrean fields.
 The last of these may have been in 217 BC. There were earthquakes in Italy during that year and the sun was reported as being dimmed by gray haze or dry fog. Plutarch wrote of the sky being on fire near Naples, and Silius Italicus mentioned in his epic poem Punica that Vesuvius had thundered and produced flames worthy of Mount Etna in that year. However, both authors were writing around 250 years later. Greenland ice core samples of around that period show relatively high acidity, which is assumed to have been caused by atmospheric hydrogen sulfide.

 The volcano was then quiet (for 295 years, if the 217 BC date for the last previous eruption is true) and was described by Roman writers as having been covered with gardens and vineyards, except at the top, which was craggy. The volcano may have had only one summit at that time, judging by a wall painting, "Bacchus and Vesuvius", found in a Pompeian house, the House of the Centenary (Casa del Centenario).
Several surviving works written over the 200 years preceding the AD 79 eruption describe the mountain as having had a volcanic nature, although Pliny the Elder did not depict the mountain in this way in his Naturalis Historia:
 The Greek historian Strabo (ca. 63 BC – 24 AD) described the mountain in Book V, Chapter 4 of his Geographica as having a predominantly flat, barren summit covered with sooty, ash-coloured rocks, and suggested that it might once have had "craters of fire". He also perceptively suggested that the fertility of the surrounding slopes may be due to volcanic activity, as at Mount Etna.
 In Book II of De architectura, the architect Vitruvius (c. 80–70 BC –?) reported that fires had once existed abundantly below the peak and that it had spouted fire onto the surrounding fields. He described Pompeiian pumice as having been burnt from another species of stone.
 Diodorus Siculus (c. 90 BC – c. 30 BC), another Greek writer, wrote in Book IV of his Bibliotheca Historica that the Campanian plain was called fiery (Phlegrean) because of the peak, Vesuvius, which had spouted flames like Etna and showed signs of the fire that had burnt in ancient history.

Eruption of AD 79

In AD 79, Vesuvius erupted in one of the most catastrophic eruptions of all time. Historians have learned about the eruption from the eyewitness account of Pliny the Younger, a Roman administrator and poet. Several dates are given in the surviving copies of the letters. The latest evidence supports earlier findings and indicates that the eruption occurred after 17 October.

The cities of Pompeii and Herculaneum were destroyed by pyroclastic surges and the ruins buried under tens of metres of tephra.

Precursors and foreshocks
The AD 79 eruption was preceded by a powerful earthquake in 62, which caused widespread destruction around the Bay of Naples, and particularly to Pompeii. Some of the damage had still not been repaired when the volcano erupted. The deaths of 600 sheep from "tainted air" in the vicinity of Pompeii indicates that the earthquake of AD 62 may have been related to new activity by Vesuvius.

The Romans grew accustomed to minor earth tremors in the region; the writer Pliny the Younger even wrote that they "were not particularly alarming because they are frequent in Campania". Small earthquakes started taking place four days before the eruption becoming more frequent over the next four days, but the warnings were not recognized.

Scientific analysis

Reconstructions of the eruption and its effects vary considerably in the details but have the same overall features. The eruption lasted two days. The morning of the first day was perceived as normal by the only eyewitness to leave a surviving document, Pliny the Younger. In the middle of the day, an explosion threw up a high-altitude column from which ash and pumice began to fall, blanketing the area. Rescues and escapes occurred during this time. At some time in the night or early the next day, pyroclastic surges in the close vicinity of the volcano began. Lights were seen on the peak, interpreted as fires. People as far away as Misenum fled for their lives. The flows were rapid-moving, dense and very hot, knocking down, wholly or partly, all structures in their path, incinerating or suffocating all population remaining there and altering the landscape, including the coastline. Additional light tremors accompanied these and a mild tsunami in the Bay of Naples. By late afternoon of the second day, the eruption was over, leaving only haze in the atmosphere through which the sun shone weakly.

The latest scientific studies of the ash produced by Vesuvius reveal a multi-phase eruption. The chief energy supporting the column came from the escape of steam superheated by the magma, created from seawater seeping over time into the deep faults of the region, which interacted with magma.

Subsequently, the cloud collapsed as the gases expanded and lost their capability to support their solid contents, releasing it as a pyroclastic surge, which first reached Herculaneum but not Pompeii. Additional blasts reinstituted the column. The eruption alternated between Plinian and Peléan six times. Surges 3 and 4 are believed by the authors to have buried Pompeii. Surges are identified in the deposits by dune and cross-bedding formations, which are not produced by fallout.

Another study used the magnetic characteristics of over 200 samples of roof-tile and plaster fragments collected around Pompeii to estimate the equilibrium temperature of the pyroclastic flow. The magnetic study revealed that on the first day of the eruption a fall of white pumice containing clastic fragments of up to  fell for several hours. This period would have been the last opportunity to escape.

The collapse of the Plinian columns on the second day caused pyroclastic density currents (PDCs) that devastated Herculaneum and Pompeii. Any population remaining in structural refuges could not have escaped, as gases of incinerating temperatures surrounded the city. The lowest temperatures were in rooms under collapsed roofs.

The two Plinys
The only surviving eyewitness account of the event consists of two letters by Pliny the Younger to the historian Tacitus. Pliny the Younger describes, amongst other things, the last days in the life of his uncle, Pliny the Elder. His nephew declined to join the party. One of the nephew's letters relates what he could discover from witnesses of his uncle's experiences. In a second letter, the younger Pliny details his own observations after the departure of his uncle.

The two men saw an extraordinarily dense cloud rising rapidly above the peak. This cloud and a request by a messenger for an evacuation by sea prompted the elder Pliny to order rescue operations in which he sailed away to participate. His nephew attempted to resume a normal life, but that night a tremor awoke him and his mother, prompting them to abandon the house for the courtyard. Further tremors near dawn caused the population to abandon the village and caused disastrous wave action in the Bay of Naples.

A massive black cloud glistering with lighting obscured the early-morning light, a scene Pliny describes as sheet lightning. The cloud obscured Point Misenum near at hand and the island of Capraia (Capri) across the bay. Fearing for their lives, the population began to flee the shore along the road. An ash rain fell, causing Pliny to shake it off periodically to avoid being buried. Later that same day, the pumice and ash stopped falling, and the sun shone weakly through the cloud, encouraging Pliny and his mother to return to their home and wait for news of Pliny the Elder.

Pliny's uncle, Pliny the Elder, was in command of the Roman fleet at Misenum and had meanwhile decided to investigate the phenomenon at close hand in a light vessel. As the ship was preparing to leave the area, a messenger came from his friend Rectina (wife of Tascius) living on the coast near the foot of the volcano, explaining that her party could only get away by sea and asking for rescue. Pliny ordered the immediate launching of the fleet galleys to the evacuation of the coast. He continued in his light ship to the rescue of Rectina's party.

He set off across the bay but, in the shallows on the other side, encountered thick showers of hot cinders, lumps of pumice and pieces of rock. Advised by the helmsman to turn back, he stated, "Fortune favors the brave" and ordered him to continue to Stabiae (about 4.5 km from Pompeii).

Pliny the Elder and his party saw what they believed to be flames coming from several parts of the crater. After staying overnight, the party was driven from the building by an accumulation of material, presumably tephra, which threatened to block all egress. They woke Pliny, who had been napping and emitting loud snoring. They elected to take to the fields with pillows tied to their heads to protect them from the raining debris. They approached the beach again, but the wind prevented the ships from leaving. Pliny sat down on a sail that had been spread for him and could not rise even with assistance when his friends departed. Though Pliny the Elder died, his friends ultimately escaped by land.

In the first letter to Tacitus, Pliny the Younger suggested that his uncle's death was due to the reaction of his weak lungs to a cloud of poisonous, sulphurous gas that wafted over the group. However, Stabiae was 16 km from the vent (roughly where the modern town of Castellammare di Stabia is situated), and his companions were unaffected by the volcanic gases. It is more likely that the corpulent Pliny died from another cause, such as a stroke or heart attack. His body was found with no apparent injuries on the next day, after dispersal of the plume.

Casualties

Along with Pliny, the Elder, the only other noble casualties of the eruption to be known by name were Agrippa (a son of the Herodian Jewish princess Drusilla and the procurator Antonius Felix) and his wife.

By 2003, around 1,044 casts made from impressions of bodies in the ash deposits had been recovered in and around Pompeii, with the scattered bones of another 100. The remains of about 332 bodies have been found at Herculaneum (300 in arched vaults discovered in 1980). What percentage these numbers are of the total dead or the percentage of the dead to the total number at risk remain unknown.

Thirty-eight percent of the 1,044 were found in the ash fall deposits, the majority inside buildings. These are thought to have been killed mainly by roof collapses, with the smaller number of victims found outside of buildings probably being killed by falling roof slates or by larger rocks thrown out by the volcano. The remaining 62% of remains found at Pompeii were in the pyroclastic surge deposits, and thus were probably killed by them – probably from a combination of suffocation from inhaling ashes and blast and debris thrown around. Examination of cloth, frescoes and skeletons shows that, in contrast to the victims found at Herculaneum, it is unlikely that high temperatures were a significant cause of the destruction at Pompeii. Herculaneum, much closer to the crater, was saved from tephra falls by the wind direction but was buried under  of material deposited by pyroclastic surges. Likely, most of the known victims in this town were killed by the surges.

People caught on the former seashore by the first surge died of thermal shock. The rest were concentrated in arched chambers at a density of as high as three persons per square metre. As only  of the coast have been excavated, further casualties may be discovered.

Later eruptions from the 3rd to the 19th centuries

Since the eruption of AD 79, Vesuvius has erupted around three dozen times.
 It erupted again in 203, during the lifetime of the historian Cassius Dio.
 In 472, it ejected such a volume of ash that ashfalls were reported as far away as Constantinople (760 mi.; 1,220 km).
 The eruptions of 512 were so severe that those inhabiting the slopes of Vesuvius were granted exemption from taxes by Theodoric the Great, the Gothic king of Italy.
 Further eruptions were recorded in 787, 968, 991, 999, 1007 and 1036 with the first recorded lava flows.

The volcano became quiescent at the end of the 13th century, and in the following years, it again became covered with gardens and vineyards as old. Even the inside of the crater was moderately filled with shrubbery.

 Vesuvius entered a new phase in December 1631, when a major eruption buried many villages under lava flows, killing around 3,000 people. Torrents of lahar were also created, adding to the devastation. Activity thereafter became almost continuous, with relatively severe eruptions occurring in 1660, 1682, 1694, 1698, 1707, 1737, 1760, 1767, 1779, 1794, 1822, 1834, 1839, 1850, 1855, 1861, 1868, 1872, 1906, 1926, 1929, and 1944.

Eruptions in the 20th century

 The eruption of 5 April 1906 killed more than 100 people and ejected the most lava ever recorded from a Vesuvian eruption. Italian authorities were preparing to hold the 1908 Summer Olympics when Mount Vesuvius violently erupted, devastating the city of Naples and surrounding comunes. Funds were diverted to reconstructing Naples, and a new site for the Olympics had to be found.
 Vesuvius was active from 1913 through 1944, with lava filling the crater and occasional outflows of small amounts of lava.
 That eruptive period ended in the major eruption of March 1944, which destroyed the villages of San Sebastiano al Vesuvio, Massa di Somma, and Ottaviano, and part of San Giorgio a Cremano. From 13 to 18 March 1944, activity was confined within the rim. Finally, on 18 March 1944, lava overflowed the rim. Lava flows destroyed nearby villages from 19 March through 22 March. On 24 March, an explosive eruption created an ash plume and a small pyroclastic flow.

In March 1944, the United States Army Air Forces (USAAF) 340th Bombardment Group was based at Pompeii Airfield near Terzigno, Italy, just a few kilometres from the eastern base of the volcano. The tephra and hot ash from multiple days of the eruption damaged the fabric control surfaces, the engines, the Plexiglas windscreens and the gun turrets of the 340th's B-25 Mitchell medium bombers. Estimates ranged from 78 to 88 aircraft destroyed.

The eruption could be seen from Naples. Different perspectives and the damage caused to the local villages were recorded by USAAF photographers and other personnel based nearer to the volcano.

Future

From the 1631 eruption until 1944, there was a comparatively small eruption every few years, emitting 0.001–0.01 km³ of magma.

Magma sitting in an underground chamber for many years will start to see higher melting point constituents such as olivine crystallizing out. The effect is to increase the concentration of dissolved gases (mostly sulfur dioxide and carbon dioxide) in the remaining liquid magma, making the subsequent eruption more violent. As gas-rich magma approaches the surface during an eruption, the huge drop in internal pressure caused by the reduction in weight of the overlying rock (which drops to zero at the surface) causes the gases to come out of solution, the volume of gas increasing explosively from nothing to perhaps many times that of the accompanying magma. Additionally, the removal of the higher melting point material will raise the concentration of felsic components such as silicates, potentially making the magma more viscous, adding to the explosive nature of the eruption.

The government emergency plan for an eruption therefore assumes that the worst case will be an eruption of similar size and type to the 1631 VEI 4 eruption. Because of prevailing winds, towns and cities south and east of the volcano are most at risk from this. It is assumed that tephra accumulation exceeding —at which point people are at risk from collapsing roofs—may extend out as far as Avellino to the east or Salerno to the south-east. Near Naples, this tephra fall hazard is assumed to extend barely past the volcano's slopes to the northwest. The specific areas affected by the ash cloud depend upon the circumstances surrounding the eruption.

The plan assumes between two weeks and 20 days notice of an eruption and foresees the emergency evacuation of 600,000 people, almost entirely comprising all those living in the zona rossa ("red zone"), i.e. at greatest risk from pyroclastic flows. The evacuation, by train, ferry, car, and bus, is planned to take about seven days, and the evacuees would mostly be sent to other parts of the country, rather than to safe areas in the local Campania region, and may have to stay away for several months. However, the dilemma that would face those implementing the plan is when to start this massive evacuation: If it starts too late, thousands could be killed, whereas if it is started too early, the indicators of an eruption may turn out to be a false alarm. In 1984, 40,000 people were evacuated from the Campi Flegrei area, another volcanic complex near Naples, but no eruption occurred.

Ongoing efforts are being made by the government at various levels (especially of Campania) to reduce the population living in the red zone, by demolishing illegally constructed buildings, establishing a national park around the whole volcano to prevent the future construction of buildings and by offering sufficient financial incentives to people for moving away. One of the underlying goals is to reduce the time needed to evacuate the area, over the next twenty to thirty years, to two or three days.

The volcano is closely monitored by the Osservatorio Vesuvio in Naples with extensive networks of seismic and gravimetric stations, a combination of a GPS-based geodetic array and satellite-based synthetic aperture radar to measure ground movement and by local surveys and chemical analyses of gases emitted from fumaroles. All of this is intended to track magma rising underneath the volcano. , no magma has been detected within 10 km of the surface, so the volcano is classified by the Observatory as at a Basic or Green Level of hazard.

National park

The area around Vesuvius was officially declared a national park on 5 June 1995. The summit of Vesuvius is open to visitors, and there is a small network of paths around the volcano that are maintained by the park authorities on weekends. There is access by road to within  of the summit (measured vertically), but after that, access is on foot only. There is a spiral walkway around the volcano from the road to the crater.

Funicular

Mount Vesuvius' first funicular — a type of vertical transport that uses two opposing, interconnected, rail-guided passenger cars always moving in concert — opened in 1880, subsequently destroyed by the March 1944 eruption. 

"Funiculì, Funiculà", a Neapolitan language song, was written to commemorate the opening of the first funicular on Mount Vesuvius.

See also

 Battle of Mount Vesuvius
 List of volcanic eruptions by death toll
 List of volcanoes in Italy
 List of stratovolcanoes

Notes

References

Bibliography

External links

 
 
 
 

 
Active volcanoes
Campanian volcanic arc
Complex volcanoes
Decade Volcanoes
Geography of Naples
Sacred mountains
Stratovolcanoes of Italy
Subduction volcanoes
VEI-6 volcanoes
Parks in Campania
20th-century volcanic events
19th-century volcanic events
18th-century volcanic events
17th-century volcanic events
16th-century volcanic events
Medieval volcanic events
Pompeii (ancient city)
Geological type localities
Tourist attractions in Campania
Articles containing video clips